Hadewijch is a 2009 French film directed by Bruno Dumont that, in the person of a troubled teenage girl, explores conflicting interpretations of Catholicism and Islam. It won the International Film Critics' award at the 2009 Toronto International Film Festival.

Plot
Hadewijch, preparing to be a nun in a Catholic convent, is sent home because her excessive devotion and asceticism are judged to be dangerous. Back with her wealthy parents in Paris as their daughter Céline, she signs on for a course in theology. In a café, she falls into conversation with Yassine, a young man from the outskirts with little education and no job. He accepts that she wants no physical love, because she belongs to Jesus, and takes her to meet his older brother Nassir, who gives lectures on Qu'ranic theology. Nassir convinces her that God demands not just devotion and asceticism, but also action against injustice in the world. He takes her to an Arabic-speaking country, where she is enrolled in a jihadist movement, and the two then return to Paris to explode a bomb by the Arc de Triomphe. Back at the convent, Hadewijch finds the absence of Jesus unbearable and, when police come to question her, throws herself into a pond. A rescuer arrives in the person of a young workman just out of jail.

Scholarly and critical reception
Critics have noted the influence of Robert Bresson and Mathieu Kassovitz. Bruno Dumont has remarked that the comparisons between his work and Robert Bresson are often exaggerated.

Cast
 Julie Sokolowski as Soeur Hadewijch/Céline
 Yassine Salim as Yassine
 Karl Sarafidis as Nassir
 David Dewaele as David
 Brigitte Mayeux-Clergot as Mother Superior
 Luc-François Bouyssonie as Céline's father
 Marie Castelaine as Céline's mother

References

External links
 Official website
 
 The lesson given in the film by Nassir on the ghâyb
 Dumont website
 

2009 films
2009 drama films
French drama films
2000s French-language films
Films about religion
Films set in Paris
Films directed by Bruno Dumont
2000s French films